Arian González Pérez (born 1988) is a Spanish-Cuban chess player. He was awarded the title of Grandmaster (GM) by FIDE in 2018.

Arrest and hunger-strike
A lawyer, González traveled to Cuba to take care of his sick mother. While there, he took part in the 2021 Cuban protests and was arrested for "public disorder" and "incitement to the masses". On 21 July, after a week's imprisonment, he began a hunger strike aimed at the indifference of the Spanish government. Top Cuban-born grandmasters Lázaro Bruzón and Leinier Domínguez, as well as previous world champion Garry Kasparov, spoke out in support.

References

External links
 
 
 

1988 births
Living people
Cuban chess players
Spanish chess players
Chess grandmasters